Adam Darrehsi-ye Sofla (also Romanized as Ādam Darrehsī-ye Soflá; also known as Ādam Darrehsī-ye Pā’īn) is a village in Angut-e Gharbi Rural District, Anguti District, Germi County, Ardabil Province, Iran. At the 2006 census, its population was 35, in 10 families.

References 

Towns and villages in Germi County